The Thank You & Goodnight: The Farewell Tour (also known as the 25th Anniversary & Farewell Tour and Boyzone Live: In Celebration of their 25th Anniversary) is the eighth and final concert tour by Irish boy band, Boyzone. The tour supports the group's seventh studio album, Thank You & Goodnight (2018). The tour performed over 50 shows in Asia, Europe, and Australasia.

Background
The tour was announced in June 2018, alongside their album. In the media, band members stated this would be their final tour and a farewell tour. Before the tour commenced, the band played several music festivals in the United Kingdom, including: "June Meeting", "Scotfest", "Kew the Music", the "York Races Music Showcase" and the "Ringsted Festival". 

Speaking on the tour, the band stated: "Twenty-five years is a long time. […] We're also eager to invite you all to one final celebration of twenty-five years of Boyzone and our journey together. We would love for you to raise the roof one last time as we head out on our farewell UK and Ireland arena tour." 

During the shows in southwest Asia, Keith Duffy was unable to perform several shows after falling ill in Hong Kong. Duffy returned to the stage for the show in Adelaide.

Critical reception
The shows received mass praise throughout the run of the tour. For the Glasgow performance, Graeme Virtue from The Guardian gave the show three out of five stars. He says, "Despite the quartet being framed by a gigantic screen beaming lyric videos and vintage footage of the band as fresh-faced youngsters, this is a refreshingly gimmick-free gig. Except for two glam back-up singers, there is no band on stage and at no point does a 'Zoner strap on an acoustic or slide behind a piano to underline their musical authenticity."

Moving to Australasia, Jordan Brunnen of OutInPerth gave the show in Perth three and a half out of five stars. He said, "The concert demonstrated Boyzone's history and changes, having begun before the internet(!), yet they stay relevant with young energy on stage. Above all, the performance bought it all together for those who really love them most: those with fond memories of a youth with Boyzone playing on their mp3 players and radios."

In Wellington, Kate Robertson of Stuff wrote the band gave the crowd everything they wanted. She goes on to say, "Farewell tours are nearly always a guaranteed home run, because any group that cares about its fans will know they only want the hits. With that in mind, Boyzone made clear they cared. A lot The covers, the classics and the originals. There was no time to dwell on the sadness of it all, which instead made way for a set that was full of life, joy and gratitude. If this really is the end for the boisterous Irish boy band, they threw their fans on helluva leaving party."

Opening acts
Asher Knight 
Miccoli 
Brian McFadden 
Luena 
Isyana Sarasvati

Setlist
The following setlist was obtained from the concert held on 29 January 2019, at the Motorpoint Arena in Nottingham, England. It does not represent all concerts for the duration of the tour. 
"Who We Are"
"Love Is a Hurricane"
"Isn't It a Wonder"
"Coming Home Now"
"Baby Can I Hold You"
"I Love the Way You Love Me"
"Because"
"Father and Son"
"Dream"
"Every Day I Love You"
"Key to My Life"
"Words"
"Talk About Love"
"Love You Anyway"
"When You Say Nothing at All"
"Love Me for a Reason"
"No Matter What"
"A Different Beat"
"When the Going Gets Tough"
"Life Is a Rollercoaster"
"Picture of You"

Tour dates

Festivals and other miscellaneous performances
This concert was a part of the "Prambanan Jazz Festival"
This concert was a part of the "I love the 90's - The party"

Box office score data

References

Boyzone
2018 concert tours
2019 concert tours